Sir James Fullerton (c. 1563 – 7 January 1631) was a Scottish courtier and politician during the reigns of James I of England and Charles I. 

He was probably the son of John Fullerton. He was a fellow of Trinity College Dublin, one of the first two created at its establishment. Known as "a Scotch gentleman of great learning and very great worth" he was brought to the English court by King James I in 1610 to serve Prince Charles. He was Gentleman of the Bedchamber and Keeper of the Privy Purse to Prince Charles 1611–16, and promoted to Groom of the Stool in 1616, when Charles became Prince of Wales, a position he retained until his death when Charles became king.

In 1625, he was elected to Parliament for St Mawes constituency. During the Parliament, he worked on a bill to permit coal mining in Macclesfield, and worked on a religious address and a bill to prevent secret inquisitions. He was ordered to present Parliament's protestations to King Charles setting out their position against further financial 'supply'.

He was appointed to represent Portsmouth in 1626. Later he served as ambassador to France.

In 1616, at Abbots Langley, he married Magdalene Clerk Bruce, Baroness Kinloss, widow of Edward Bruce, 1st Lord Kinloss.

He is buried in Westminster Abbey.

References

 

1560s births
1631 deaths
Scottish courtiers
English MPs 1625
English MPs 1626
Fellows of Trinity College Dublin
Burials at Westminster Abbey
Court of Charles I of England
Knights Bachelor
Scottish knights